Volovo is a rural locality (a selo) and the administrative center of Volovsky District of Lipetsk Oblast, Russia. Population:

References

Notes

Sources

Rural localities in Lipetsk Oblast
Livensky Uyezd (Oryol Governorate)